Temascalapa is one of 125 municipalities in the State of Mexico in Mexico. It's municipal seat is the town of Temascalapa.  It is located to the north of Mexico City and to the west of the municipality. It is situated close to the border with the state of Hidalgo, and connected with the city of Tizayuca by land. This locality was formerly known as San Francisco Temascalapa.

The municipality covers an area of 168.26 km². As of 2005, the municipality had a total population of 33,063.

The region is noted for drug cartel activity after the death of Netflix's location scout, Carlos Muñoz Portal, for the TV Series Narcos: Mexico, who was found dead with multiple gunshot wounds in his car on September 15, 2017.

Martha Rodríguez Martínez, a member of the Temascalapa city council, died on January 31, 2021, after being run over by a tractor-trailer that refused to stop while the mayor carried out an awareness-raising operation about health measures related to the COVID-19 pandemic in Mexico.

See also
 Ecatepec Region

References

 
Populated places in the State of Mexico